The 2018 Ohio Bobcats football team represented Ohio University in the 2018 NCAA Division I FBS football season. They were led by 14th-year head coach Frank Solich and played their home games at Peden Stadium in Athens, Ohio as members of the East Division of the Mid-American Conference. They finished the season 9–4, 6–2 in MAC play to finish in a tie for second place in the East division. They were invited to the Frisco Bowl where they defeated San Diego State.

Previous season
The Bobcats finished the 2017 season 9–4, 5–3 in MAC play to finish in second play in the East Division. They received an invitation to the Bahamas Bowl where they defeated UAB.

Preseason

Award watch lists
Listed in the order that they were released

Preseason media poll
The MAC released their preseason media poll on July 24, 2018, with the Bobcats predicted to finish as champions of the East Division.

Schedule

Source:

Game summaries

Howard

vs Virginia

at Cincinnati

UMass

at Kent State

at Northern Illinois

Bowling Green

Ball State

at Western Michigan

at Miami (OH)

Buffalo

Akron

vs. San Diego State (Frisco Bowl)

References

Ohio
Ohio Bobcats football seasons
Frisco Bowl champion seasons
Ohio Bobcats football